af Hällström is a Finnish noble family. Its origins are in Helsingborg in Scania (then in Denmark, now in Sweden) in the 16th century. In 1724, Petter Hällström moved to Finland (then a part of Sweden), where he became the ancestor of a large family.

His grandson Gustaf Gabriel Hällström (1775–1844) was a Lutheran pastor, a physicist and rector of what is now the University of Helsinki. In 1830, his sons were ennobled for their father's accomplishments with the name af Hällström by the Grand Duke of Finland (and Tsar of Russia) Alexander II.

Notable members
 Eliel af Hällström (1865–1950), vicar and rural dean, grandson of G. G. Hällström
  (1897–1951), professor of law, son of Eliel af Hällström
  (1899–1975), movie critic, great grandson of G. G. Hällström
 Roland af Hällström (1905–1956), movie director, brother of Raoul af Hällström
 Gunnar af Hällström (1908–1964), professor of mathematics, great grandson of G. G. Hällström
  (1916–1990), intendant of Suomenlinna, son of Eliel af Hällström
  (1923–2003), member of the Supreme Court, brother of Olof af Hällström
  (born 1950), professor of theology, son of Harald af Hällström
  (born 1952), theater director, son of Roland af Hällström

References

External links
Website 

Finnish noble families
Finnish families of Swedish ancestry